Gene Calvin Cox was a football coach at Leon High School in Tallahassee, Florida, United States.  Over his 38-year career at four schools, his teams won 313 games, a feat that has not been duplicated as of 2006. In 1988, he was inducted into the State of Florida Sports Hall of Fame. In 1998, the City of Tallahassee renamed the local high school football stadium Gene Cox Stadium.

Cox received his bachelor's degree from Florida State University in 1956 after playing on the 1954 and 1955 Florida State Seminole football teams.

He died on March 30, 2009 at age 74.

Head coaching record

References

1935 births
2009 deaths
Florida State Seminoles football players
High school football coaches in Florida
People from Lake City, Florida